Robert Hope (28 September 1943 – 10 June 2022) was a Scottish footballer who made more than 400 appearances as a midfielder in the Football League. He spent most of his club career at West Bromwich Albion, where he played more than 300 league games and helped the club win two major trophies. He won seven caps for Scotland.

Career
Born in Bridge of Allan, Stirlingshire, Hope played for West Bromwich Albion between 1959 and 1972, when they were a Football League First Division side. A cultured, scheming inside-forward, he was the general in the team's midfield throughout the 1960s. Together with Clive Clark on the wing, Hope provided the ammunition for players like Tony Brown and Jeff Astle. Hope enjoyed success during this period, winning the League Cup in 1966 and FA Cup in 1968. He scored Albion's first goal in European competition when he found the net against DOS Utrecht in the Inter-Cities Fairs Cup on 2 November 1966.

In April 1971, Hope was awarded a testimonial match against Athletic Bilbao, then managed by Ronnie Allen, who later had two short spells as Albion manager; the fixture was reciprocated in Spain a few weeks later for the benefit of José Ángel Iribar. He moved to Birmingham City in 1972, spending time on loan in the NASL with Philadelphia Atoms and Dallas Tornado, and later played for Sheffield Wednesday and Bromsgrove Rovers. He went on to manage Bromsgrove and Burton Albion. He returned to West Brom as a scout in later years, and was appointed chief scout in 2000.

Hope made seven appearances for the Scotland national team. Five of these appearances were during a 1967 overseas tour that the Scottish Football Association decided in October 2021 to reclassify as full internationals, which increased Hope's cap tally from two to seven. 

West Brom announced on 11 June that he had died on 10 June 2022, aged 78.

Honours
West Bromwich Albion
FA Cup: 1967–68
Football League Cup: 1965–66

References

External links
 
 NASL Team Rosters

1943 births
2022 deaths
People from Bridge of Allan
Scottish footballers
Footballers from Stirling (council area)
Association football midfielders
Association football inside forwards
Scotland international footballers
Scotland under-23 international footballers
FA Cup Final players
North American Soccer League (1968–1984) players
West Bromwich Albion F.C. players
Birmingham City F.C. players
Sheffield Wednesday F.C. players
Philadelphia Atoms players
Dallas Tornado players
Bromsgrove Rovers F.C. players
Scottish football managers
Association football scouts
Burton Albion F.C. managers
Scottish expatriate footballers
Scottish expatriate sportspeople in the United States
Expatriate soccer players in the United States